Rorke is a surname that may refer to:

Daniel Rorke, Australian saxophonist who resides in Norway
Gordon Rorke (born 1938), Australian cricketer
Hayden Rorke (1910–1987), American actor
James Rorke (1827-1875), British settler in southern Africa, owner of the farmstead Rorke's Drift
John Rorke (1807–1896), Irish-born Canadian merchant and political figure in Newfoundland
Joseph Rorke (1832–1907), Canadian businessman and politician from Ontario
Margaret Hayden Rorke (1883-1969), American suffragist and writer
Mary Rorke (1858–1938), British actor
W. H. Rorke (fl. 1901–1902), American college football coach

See also
Rorke's Drift Art and Craft Centre, in KwaZulu-Natal, South Africa
Battle of Rorke's Drift (1879), in what is now Natal Province, South Africa